Equestrian competitions at the 2023 Pan American Games in Santiago, Chile are scheduled to be held from October 22 to November 3. The venue for the competition is the Escuela de equitación regimiento granaderos.

A total of 150 athletes are scheduled to compete in the three disciplines of dressage, eventing and jumping, each with an individual and team event.

All three disciplines will serve as qualifiers for the 2024 Summer Olympics in Paris, France.

Qualification

A quota of 150 equestrian riders (44 dressage, 46 eventing and 60 show jumping) will be allowed to qualify. A maximum of 12 athletes can compete for a nation across all events (with a maximum of four per discipline). Athletes qualified through various qualifying events and rankings.

Participating nations
A total of 7 countries qualified Equestrian teams. The numbers in parenthesis represents the number of participants qualified.

Medal summary

Medalists

References

Equestrian
2023
2023 in equestrian